Achával is a surname. Notable people with the surname include:

 Miguel de Achával (born 1982), Argentine rugby player
 Perla Achával, Argentine actress
 Roberto Achával (1930–1996), Argentine tango violinist
 Santiago Achával, Argentine winemaker
 Sofia Achaval de Montaigu, Argentine model, stylist, and designer